Falsafa: The Other Side is a 2019 Bollywood action thriller film directed by Himanshu Yadav and starring Manit Joura, Geetanjali Singh, Ridhima Grover and  Sumit Gulati in the lead roles. The film was scheduled to release on 11 January 2019.

Plot
Falsafa: The Other Side is a philosophical drama film about how wrong paths or evil decisions are taken in one moment of anger can change many lives.  The lead characters of the film are Aman (Manit Joura), and Isha (Geetanjali Singh) whose quest for revenge intertwines their lives with each other. Aman's parents have been murdered, and he is on a quest to seek revenge. On the other hand, Isha's father is dead, and she's convinced that it's a murder. Will they make the right choice?

Cast
The trailer launch of Falsafa: The Other Side was done by the team of the Zee TV Serial ‘Kundali Bhagya‘ at The View, in Andheri. The details of the cast of the film is given below.
 Manit Joura as Aman
 Geetanjali Singh as Isha				
 Ridhima Grover as Sanjana				
 Sumit Gulati as Rishabh				
 Amitabh Srivastava as Aman’s Father			
 Geeta Agrawal as Aman’s Mother	
 Neeraj Kalra as Isha’s Father			
 Sheetal Dimri as Isha’s  Mother				
 Tarun Dhingra as Mahadev		
 Hareesh Chhabra as Anirudh				
 Ambrish K Saxena as Girish			
 Sushil Dahiya as Harish Bhatija			
 Vijay Shrivastava as Inspector Kamra
 Dhaanvi as  childhood of Isha

Music 
The music director and lyricist of the film is Sagar Bhatia. The  Background Music and choreography are done by Shantanu Sudame and Arvind Thakur, respectively. The Music label is Zee Music Company.

References

2019 films
2019 action thriller films
2010s Hindi-language films
Indian action thriller films